Jammie Kirlew (born May 12, 1987) is a former American football linebacker. He was drafted by the Denver Broncos in the seventh round of the 2010 NFL Draft. He played college football at Indiana. He graduated with degrees in SPEA management and public financial management in December 2009. The two-time All-Big Ten selection and two-time team MVP closed out his career tied for third on the Hoosiers' career sacks list with 23 and second on the career tackles for loss list with 52.5. Kirlew played in 48 career games with 41 starts. He collected 220 tackles, 152 solo, with nine forced fumbles and six fumble recoveries.

Kirlew has also been a member of the Buffalo Bills and Jacksonville Jaguars.

On December 9, 2011 Kirlew was signed to the practice squad of the Jacksonville Jaguars. on the December 27, 2011 Kirlew was promoted to the active roster. He was cut by the Jaguars on April 27, 2012.

He was signed by the Saskatchewan Roughriders on February 6, 2013. He was subsequently released on April 19, 2013 without playing a single game with the Roughriders.

On April 22, Kirlew signed as a defensive lineman with the Berlin Rebels of the German Football League.

On February 6, 2014, Kirlew was assigned to the Tampa Bay Storm of the Arena Football League.

References

External links
Indiana Hoosiers bio 
Arena Football League bio 

1987 births
Living people
Players of American football from Orlando, Florida
American football linebackers
Indiana Hoosiers football players
Denver Broncos players
Buffalo Bills players
Jacksonville Jaguars players
Saskatchewan Roughriders players
Tampa Bay Storm players
Cypress Creek High School (Florida) alumni
German Football League players
American expatriate sportspeople in Germany
American expatriate players of American football